Division Street is a one-way street in the Two Bridges neighborhood of Lower Manhattan in New York City. It carries westbound traffic from the intersection of Canal Street and Ludlow Street westward to Bowery.

History 
The street dates back to before 1789. Its namesake is the division it marks between the street grid patterns on either side of it.

A segment of the IRT Second Avenue Line used to run along Division Street between Bowery and Allen Street.

The portion of Division Street under the Manhattan Bridge is used for a mall called the East Broadway Mall. There is a car park at Market Street (formerly Florence Place) and next to it is the PS 124 Yung Wing Elementary School. The school is part of a residential complex called Confucius Plaza. At this point, the street widens. Buses to Flushing and casinos park on the right side. There used to be a greenmarket until it moved to the space under the Manhattan Bridge on Forsyth Street between Canal Street and Division Street. East of Bowery, there is a statue of Confucius. At Bowery, most of the traffic gets diverted to the Bowery, Chatham Square, and the Manhattan Bridge.

Points of interest
Seward Park (on Canal and Essex Street)
Confucius Plaza
Agia Barbara (on Forsyth Street)
Eldridge Street Synagogue (on Eldridge Street)
East Broadway Mall
Imperial Ballroom Dance Studio

References

External links
https://web.archive.org/web/20071205042310/http://www.mcny.org/collections/abbott/a111.htm

Streets in Manhattan
Chinatown, Manhattan